Men's Vogue was a monthly men's magazine that covered fashion, design, art, culture, sports and technology. The premier issue was August 2005. On 30 October 2008 Condé Nast announced that they intended to fold the magazine into Vogue proper as a bi-annual subscriber's supplement. However, the magazine has ceased to be published since its original folding date.

Cover stories
The magazine featured a profile of George Clooney in its inaugural issue. Since then, other stars including Roger Federer, Tiger Woods, Michael Phelps, Denzel Washington, Kiefer Sutherland, Viggo Mortensen, Tony Blair and Barack Obama have been featured on the cover. The magazine received praise for its December 2007 issue, with Will Smith on the cover, for celebrating African-American men.

Content
The magazine featured celebrities, athletes, powerbrokers, and lesser known men of style. Areas covered included art and architecture, travel and food, politics and finance, books and sports, custom tailoring and fine watches, and other topics. The magazine added a tag line below its logo in November 2008 (its final issue), "Style is how you live."

Regular features
The magazine presented a yearly list of its chosen American visionaries. Recipients of the 2007 recognition included Ralph Lauren, actor Owen Wilson and director Wes Anderson. It also featured profiles in each issue of everyday stylish and successful men in its Life Studies section.

Personnel 
The magazine was founded by Jay Fielden with support from Vogue's Anna Wintour. After Men's Vogue folded, Fielden became the editor of Hearst's Town & Country in 2011, and then the editor of Esquire, replacing David Granger in 2016.

International editions 
In addition to the American edition, several international editions of Men's Vogue exist. The first "Men's Vogue" edition published by Condé Nast was L'Uomo Vogue in Italy, which was launched in September 1967 and is now published quarterly. A French edition named Vogue Hommes International was launched in 1985, and it is published bi-annually in Fall/Winter and Spring/Summer issues.

Several other international editions were created in the aftermath of the American launch, though many of these were either rebranded or shut down within a few years. Examples include:

 Vogue Man Nederland (launched in September 2015)
 Vogue Hommes Japan (launched in September 2008, defunct as of 2012 and relaunched as GQ Style in 2013)
 Vogue Hombre in Mexico (bi-annual issues/supplements in November and June)
 Vogue Men Turkiye in Turkey (launched in June 2012)
 Vogue Man in India (launched in May 2008, defunct and relaunched as GQ India)
 Men's Vogue China (launched in April 2008, defunct as of 2012)
 Vogue Homem in Brazil (launched in May 2006, defunct as of 2011 and relaunched as GQ Brazil)
Vogue Man in Poland (a one-time special issue of Vogue Polska, published in October 2019)

References

2005 establishments in the United States
2008 disestablishments in the United States
Men's magazines published in the United States
Monthly magazines published in the United States
Defunct magazines published in the United States
Magazines established in 2005
Magazines disestablished in 2008
Men's fashion magazines
Men's